The notion of a "second Holocaust" or "another Holocaust" (עוד שואה) is an assertion that the Holocaust or a similar event is recurring or will recur. It is often used to discuss real or perceived threats to the State of Israel, the Jewish people, or the Jewish way of life.

Examples

Threats to Israel's security
Threats to Israel's security have often been described as a potential "second Holocaust". During the 1948 Arab–Israeli War, it was feared that defeat in the war would mean a second genocide of Jews, this time at the hands of Arab armies. These fears were based on antisemitism in the Arab world, many Israeli soldiers having lost relatives in the Holocaust, and the temporal proximity of the last genocide. The Arabs did not face a comparable existential threat, and the lack of motivation of Arab armies contributed to defeat in the war. The Six-Day War also led Israelis to fear another Holocaust.

Belief that Jews are threatened by another Holocaust is a key element in support for the Israeli state and its military. For example,  in 1987, Yitzhak Rabin opined that "In every generation, they try to destroy us" (quoting from the Passover Haggadah) and therefore the Holocaust could happen again. Before he came to power, Menachem Begin compared accepting reparations from Germany to allowing "another Holocaust". Before the 1982 Lebanon war, Begin told his cabinet: "Believe me, the alternative to this is Treblinka, and we have decided that there will not be another Treblinka". He also justified Operation Opera, the 1981 bombing of an Iraqi nuclear reactor, by stating that by ordering the strike he had prevented another Holocaust.

In 2018, Israeli Prime Minister Benjamin Netanyahu said "Iran wants a second Holocaust" and to "destroy another six million plus Jews", after his Iranian counterpart described Israel as a "malignant cancerous tumor". In 2020, he expressed that because it has "an independent state and a strong army", "The State of Israel will do whatever is necessary to prevent another Holocaust."

Mike Pence, former Vice President of the United States, said in 2019 that "The Iranian regime openly advocates another Holocaust and seeks the means to achieve it", referring to the Iranian nuclear program.

This tendency has been criticized by some Israelis. For example, in 2017 President Reuven Rivlin said that he disagreed with Begin's invocation of "another Treblinka": "According to this approach, the justification for the existence of the State of Israel is the prevention of the next Holocaust. Every threat is a threat to survival, every Israel-hating leader is Hitler ... any criticism of the State of Israel is anti-Semitism." He said that the approach was "fundamentally wrong" and "dangerous".

Antisemitism
Some Holocaust survivors have expressed fear that rising antisemitism in the 21st century could lead to another Holocaust. Israel Meir Lau, former Ashkenazi Chief Rabbi of Israel and a Holocaust survivor, said that while another Holocaust was possible, "this time, the fact that we have a Jewish state that deters Israel's haters, the fact that we have the Israel Defense Forces, and the fact that we have won wars decisively, makes things starkly different".

According to one survey, 58% of Americans believe something like the Holocaust could happen again.

Jewish intermarriage

In 2019, Israeli education minister Rafi Peretz compared Jewish intermarriage in the United States to a "second Holocaust". At the time, fifty-eight percent of married American Jews were married to a non-Jewish spouse. Jonathan Greenblatt, director of the Anti-Defamation League, said that Peretz' remark "trivializes the Shoah". Another criticism is that children of intermarriage may consider themselves Jews and belong to the Jewish community.

See also
Genocide prevention
Never again
Silent Holocaust
World War III

References

Nazi analogies
Aftermath of the Holocaust